De Facto is debut album by Marčelo released in 2003. It was one of the best selling albums in 2003. The most critics were risen around song "Kuća na promaji" which in short defines Marčelo's style: very personal colorful criticism over political situation in Serbia.

Track listing

References

2003 albums
Marčelo albums